Dendarus coarcticollis is a species of darkling beetles belonging to the family Tenebrionidae subfamily Tenebrioninae.

These beetles are mainly present in France and Italy.

The front legs in males are larger than in females, sexual dimorphism that allows males of these terrestrial and often dirty and slippery beetles to better hold on to the back of  females. They are nocturnal. They usually overwinter under the bark of an old tree.

External links
 Biolib
 Fauna Europaea 

Tenebrionidae
Beetles of Europe
Beetles described in 1854